"Man with Two Shadows" is the third episode of the third series of the 1960s cult British spy-fi television series The Avengers, starring Patrick Macnee and Honor Blackman. It was first broadcast by ABC on 12 October 1963. The episode was directed by Don Leaver and written by James Mitchell.

Plot
An agent who has been given multiple personalities reveals a plot to assassinate key government scientists and officials and replace them with doppelgangers. Cathy has to identify the real Steed and eliminate his imposter.

Cast
 Patrick Macnee as John Steed
 Honor Blackman as Cathy Gale 
 Daniel Moynihan as Bill Gordon 
 Paul Whitsun-Jones as Charles 
 Philip Anthony as Cummings 
 Gwendolyn Watts as Julie 
 Geoffrey Palmer as Dr. Terence 
 Anne Godfrey as Miss Quist 
 George Little as Sigi 
 Doug Robinson as Rudi Engel 
 Terence Lodge as Peter Borowski
 Robert Lankesheer as Holiday Camp Official

References

External links

Episode overview on The Avengers Forever! website

The Avengers (season 3) episodes
1963 British television episodes